The Columbian exchange, also known as the Columbian interchange, was the widespread transfer of plants, animals, precious metals, commodities, culture, human populations, technology, diseases, and ideas between the New World (the Americas) in the Western Hemisphere, and the Old World (Afro-Eurasia) in the Eastern Hemisphere, in the late 15th and following centuries. It is named after the Italian explorer Christopher Columbus and is related to the European colonization and global trade following his 1492 voyage. Some of the exchanges were purposeful; some were accidental or unintended. Communicable diseases of Old World origin resulted in an 80 to 95 percent reduction in the number of Indigenous peoples of the Americas from the 15th century onwards, most severely in the Caribbean. The cultures of both hemispheres were significantly impacted by the migration of people (both free and enslaved) from the Old World to the New. European colonists and African slaves replaced Indigenous populations across the Americas, to varying degrees. The number of Africans taken to the New World was far greater than the number of Europeans moving to the New World in the first three centuries after Columbus.

The new contacts among the global population resulted in the interchange of a wide variety of crops and livestock, which supported increases in food production and  population in the Old World. American crops such as maize, potatoes, tomatoes, tobacco, cassava, sweet potatoes, and chili peppers became important crops around the world. Old World rice, wheat, sugar cane, and livestock, among other crops, became important in the New World. American-produced silver flooded the world and became the standard metal used in coinage, especially in Imperial China.

The term was first used in 1972 by the American historian and professor Alfred W. Crosby in his environmental history book The Columbian Exchange. It was rapidly adopted by other historians and journalists.

Etymology 
In 1972 Alfred W. Crosby, an American historian at the University of Texas at Austin, published the book The Columbian Exchange, and subsequent volumes within the same decade. His primary focus was mapping the biological and cultural transfers that occurred between the Old World and New Worlds. He studied the effects of Columbus's voyages between the two – specifically, the global diffusion of crops, seeds, and plants from the New World to the Old, which radically transformed agriculture in both regions. His research made a lasting contribution to the way scholars understand the variety of contemporary ecosystems that arose due to these transfers.
The term has become popular among historians and journalists and has since been enhanced with Crosby's later book in three editions, Ecological Imperialism: The Biological Expansion of Europe, 900–1900. Charles C. Mann, in his book 1493 further expands and updates Crosby's original research.

Background
The weight of scientific evidence is that humans first came to the New World from Siberia thousands of years ago. There is little additional evidence of contacts between the peoples of the Old World and those of the New World, although the literature speculating on pre-Columbian trans-oceanic journeys is extensive. The first inhabitants of the New World brought with them domestic dogs and, possibly, a container, the calabash, both of which persisted in their new home.  The medieval explorations, visits, and brief residence of the Norsemen in Greenland, Newfoundland, and Vinland in the late 10th century and 11th century had no known impact on the Americas. Many scientists accept that possible contact between Polynesians and coastal peoples in South America around the year 1200 resulted in genetic similarities and the adoption by Polynesians of an American crop, the sweet potato. However, it was only with the first voyage of the Italian explorer Christopher Columbus and his crew to the Americas in 1492 that the Columbian exchange began, resulting in major transformations in the cultures and livelihoods of the peoples in both hemispheres.

Diseases

The first manifestation of the Columbian exchange may have been the spread of syphilis from the native people of the Caribbean Sea to Europe. The history of syphilis has been well-studied, but the origin of the disease remains a subject of debate. There are two primary hypotheses: one proposes that syphilis was carried to Europe from the Americas by the crew of Christopher Columbus in the early 1490s, while the other proposes that syphilis previously existed in Europe but went unrecognized. The first written descriptions of the disease in the Old World came in 1493. The first large outbreak of syphilis in Europe occurred in 1494–1495 among the army of Charles VIII during its invasion of Naples. Many of the crew members who had served with Columbus had joined this army. After the victory, Charles's largely mercenary army returned to their respective homes, thereby spreading "the Great Pox" across Europe and killing up to five million people.

The Columbian exchange of diseases in the other direction was by far deadlier. The peoples of the Americas had had no contact to European and African diseases and little or no immunity. An epidemic of swine influenza beginning in 1493 killed many of the Taino people inhabiting Caribbean islands. The pre-contact population of the island of Hispanola was probably at least 500,000, but by 1526, fewer than 500 were still alive. Spanish exploitation was part of the cause of the near-extinction of the native people. In 1518, smallpox was first recorded in the Americas and became the deadliest imported European disease. Forty percent of the 200,000 people living in the Aztec capital of Tenochtitlan, later Mexico City, are estimated to have died of smallpox in 1520 during the war of the Aztecs with conquistador Hernán Cortés. Epidemics, possibly of smallpox and spread from Central America, decimated the population of the Inca Empire a few years before the arrival of the Spanish. The ravages of European diseases and Spanish exploitation reduced the Mexican population from an estimated 20 million to barely more than a million in the 16th century. The indigenous population of Peru decreased from about 9 million in the pre-Columbian era to 600,000 in 1620. Scholars Nunn and Qian estimate that 80–95 percent of the Native American population died in epidemics within the first 100–150 years following 1492. The deadliest Old World diseases in the Americas were smallpox, measles, whooping cough, chicken pox, bubonic plague, typhus, and malaria.

Enslavement of Africans

The Atlantic slave trade consisted of the involuntary immigration of 11.7 million Africans, primarily from West Africa, to the Americas between the 16th and 19th centuries, far outnumbering the about 3.4 million Europeans who migrated, most voluntarily, to the New World between 1492 and 1840. The prevalence of African slaves in the New World was related to the demographic decline of New World peoples and the need of European colonists for labor. The Africans had greater immunities to Old World diseases than the New World peoples, and were less likely to die from disease.  The journey of enslaved Africans from Africa to America is commonly known as the "middle passage".

Enslaved Africans helped shape an emerging African-American culture in the New World. They participated in both skilled and unskilled labor. Their descendants gradually developed an ethnicity that drew from the numerous African tribes as well as European nationalities. The descendants of African slaves make up a majority of the population in some Caribbean countries, notably Haiti and Jamaica, and a sizeable minority in most American countries.

A movement for the abolition of slavery, known as abolitionism, developed in Europe and the Americas during the 18th century. The efforts of abolitionists eventually led to the abolition of slavery (the British Empire in 1833, the United States in 1865, and Brazil in 1888).

Silver

The New World produced 80 percent or more of the world's silver in the 16th and 17th centuries, most of it at Potosí in Bolivia, but also in Mexico. The founding of the city of Manila in the Philippines in 1571 for the purpose of facilitating trade in New World silver with China for silk, porcelain, and other luxury products has been called by scholars the "origin of world trade."  China was the world's largest economy and in the 1570s adopted silver (which it did not produce in any quantity) as its medium of exchange.  China had little interest in buying foreign products so trade consisted of large quantities of silver coming into China to pay for the Chinese products that foreign countries desired. Silver made it to Manila either through Europe and by ship around the Cape of Good Hope or across the Pacific Ocean in Spanish galleons from the Mexican port of Acapulco. From Manila the silver was transported onward to China on Portuguese and later Dutch ships.  Silver was also smuggled from Potosi to Buenos Aires, Argentina to pay slavers for African slaves imported into the New World.

The enormous quantities of silver imported into Spain and China created vast wealth but also caused inflation and the value of silver to decline. In 16th century China, six ounces of silver was equal to the value of one ounce of gold. In 1635, it took 13 ounces of silver to equal in value one ounce of gold. Taxes in both countries were assessed in the weight of silver, not its value. The shortage of revenue due to the decline in the value of silver may have contributed indirectly to the fall of the Ming dynasty in 1644. Likewise, silver from the Americas financed Spain's attempt to conquer other countries in Europe, and the decline in the value of silver left Spain faltering in the maintenance of its world-wide empire and retreating from its aggressive policies in Europe after 1650.

The wheel
Although large-scale use of wheels did not occur in the Americas prior to European contact, numerous small wheeled artifacts, identified as children's toys, have been found in Mexican archeological sites, some dating to approximately 1500 BC. Some argue that the primary obstacle to large-scale development of the wheel in the Americas was the absence of domesticated large animals that could be used to pull wheeled carriages. The closest relative of cattle present in Americas in pre-Columbian times, the American bison, is difficult to domesticate and was never domesticated by Native Americans; several horse species existed until about 12,000 years ago, but ultimately became extinct. The only large animal that was domesticated in the Western hemisphere, the llama, a pack animal, was not physically suited to use as a draft animal to pull wheeled vehicles, and use of the llama did not spread far beyond the Andes by the time of the arrival of Europeans.

On the other hand, Mesoamericans never developed the wheelbarrow, the potter's wheel, nor any other practical object with a wheel or wheels. Although present in a number of toys, very similar to those found throughout the world and still made for children today ("pull toys"), the wheel was never put into practical use in Mesoamerica before the 16th century. Possibly the closest New World civilizations came to the utilitarian wheel is the spindle whorl, and some scholars believe that the Mayan toys were originally made with spindle whorls and spindle sticks as "wheels" and "axes".

Effects

Crops
Because of the new trading resulting from the Columbian exchange, several plants native to the Americas have spread around the world, including potatoes, maize, tomatoes, and tobacco. Before 1500, potatoes were not grown outside of South America. By the 18th century, they were cultivated and consumed widely in Europe and had become important crops in both India and North America. Potatoes eventually became an important staple of the diet in much of Europe, contributing to an estimated 25% of the population growth in Afro-Eurasia between 1700 and 1900. Many European rulers, including Frederick the Great of Prussia and Catherine the Great of Russia, encouraged the cultivation of the potato.

Maize and cassava, introduced by the Portuguese from South America in the 16th century, gradually replaced sorghum and millet as Africa's most important food crops. Spanish colonizers of the 16th-century introduced new staple crops to Asia from the Americas, including maize and sweet potatoes, and thereby contributed to population growth in Asia. On a larger scale, the introduction of potatoes and maize to the Old World "resulted in caloric and nutritional improvements over previously existing staples" throughout the Eurasian landmass, enabling more varied and abundant food production.

Tomatoes, which came to Europe from the New World via Spain, were initially prized in Italy mainly for their ornamental value. But starting in the 19th century, tomato sauces became typical of Neapolitan cuisine and, ultimately, Italian cuisine in general. Coffee (introduced in the Americas circa 1720) from Africa and the Middle East and sugarcane (introduced from the Indian subcontinent) from the Spanish West Indies became the main export commodity crops of extensive Latin American plantations. Introduced to India by the Portuguese, chili and potatoes from South America have become an integral part of their cuisine.

Because crops traveled but often their endemic fungi did not, for a limited time yields were higher in their new lands. Dark & Gent 2001 term this the "". However, as globalization has continued the Columbian Exchange of pathogens has continued and crops have declined back toward their endemic yields  the honeymoon is ending.

Rice 

Rice was another crop that became widely cultivated during the Columbian exchange. As the demand in the New World grew, so did the knowledge of how to cultivate it. The two primary species used were Oryza glaberrima and Oryza sativa, originating from West Africa and Southeast Asia, respectively. European planters in the New World relied upon the skills of African slaves to cultivate both species. Georgia, South Carolina, Cuba and Puerto Rico were major centers of rice production during the colonial era. Enslaved Africans brought their knowledge of water control, milling, winnowing, and other agrarian practices to the fields. This widespread knowledge among African slaves eventually led to rice becoming a staple dietary item in the New World.

Fruits 
Citrus fruits and grapes were brought to the Americas from the Mediterranean. At first planters struggled to adapt these crops to the climates in the New World, but by the late 19th century they were cultivated more consistently.

Bananas were introduced into the Americas in the 16th century by Portuguese sailors who came across the fruits in West Africa, while engaged in commercial ventures and the slave trade. Bananas were consumed in minimal amounts in the Americas as late as the 1880s. The U.S. did not see major increases in banana consumption until large plantations were established in the Caribbean.

Tomatoes 

It took three centuries after their introduction in Europe for tomatoes to become a widely accepted food item. Tobacco, potatoes, chili peppers, tomatillos, and tomatoes are all members of the nightshade family. Similar to some European nightshade varieties, tomatoes and potatoes can be harmful or even lethal if the wrong part of the plant is consumed in excess. Physicians in the 16th century had good reason to suspect that this native Mexican fruit was poisonous; they suspected it of generating "melancholic humours".

In 1544, Pietro Andrea Mattioli, a Tuscan physician and botanist, suggested that tomatoes might be edible, but no record exists of anyone consuming them at this time. However, in 1592 the head gardener at the botanical garden of Aranjuez near Madrid, under the patronage of Philip II of Spain, wrote, "it is said [tomatoes] are good for sauces". In spite of these comments, tomatoes remained exotic plants grown for ornamental purposes, but rarely for culinary use. On October 31, 1548, the tomato was given its first name anywhere in Europe when a house steward of Cosimo I de' Medici, Duke of Florence, wrote to the Medici's private secretary that the basket of pomi d'oro "had arrived safely". At this time, the label pomi d'oro was also used to refer to figs, melons, and citrus fruits in treatises by scientists. In the early years, tomatoes were mainly grown as ornamentals in Italy. For example, the Florentine aristocrat Giovan Vettorio Soderini wrote that they "were to be sought only for their beauty" and were grown only in gardens or flower beds. Tomatoes were grown in elite town and country gardens in the fifty years or so following their arrival in Europe, and were only occasionally depicted in works of art. The first Italian cookbook to include tomato sauce, Lo Scalco alla Moderna ('The Modern Steward'), was written by Italian chef Antonio Latini and was published in two volumes in 1692 and 1694. The use of tomato sauce with pasta appeared for the first time in 1790 in the Italian cookbook L'Apicio Moderno ('The Modern Apicius'), by chef Francesco Leonardi.

Livestock

Initially at least, the Columbian exchange of animals largely went in one direction, from Europe to the New World, as the Eurasian regions had domesticated many more animals. Horses, donkeys, mules, pigs, cattle, sheep, goats, chickens, large dogs, cats, and bees were rapidly adopted by native peoples for transport, food, and other uses. One of the first European exports to the Americas, the horse, changed the lives of many Native American tribes. The mountain tribes shifted to a nomadic lifestyle, based on hunting bison on horseback. They largely gave up settled agriculture. Horse culture was adopted gradually by Great Plains Indians. The existing Plains tribes expanded their territories with horses, and the animals were considered so valuable that horse herds became a measure of wealth. (This transfer reintroduced horses to the Americas, as the species had died out there prior to the development of the modern horse in Eurasia.)

While mesoamerican peoples (Mayas in particular) already practiced apiculture, producing wax and honey from a variety of bees (such as Melipona or Trigona), European bees (Apis mellifera)—more productive, delivering a honey with less water content and allowing for an easier extraction from beehives—were introduced in New Spain, becoming an important part of farming production.

The effects of the introduction of European livestock on the environments and peoples of the New World were not always positive. In the Caribbean, the proliferation of European animals consumed native fauna and undergrowth, changing habitat. If free ranging, the animals often damaged conucos, plots managed by indigenous peoples for subsistence.

The Mapuche of Araucanía were fast to adopt the horse from the Spanish, and improve their military capabilities as they fought the Arauco War against Spanish colonizers. Until the arrival of the Spanish, the Mapuches had largely maintained chilihueques (llamas) as livestock. The Spanish introduction of sheep caused some competition between the two domesticated species. Anecdotal evidence of the mid-17th century show that by then both species coexisted but that the sheep far outnumbered the llamas. The decline of llamas reached a point in the late 18th century when only the Mapuche from Mariquina and Huequén next to Angol raised the animal. In the Chiloé Archipelago the introduction of pigs by the Spanish proved a success. They could feed on the abundant shellfish and algae exposed by the large tides.

In the other direction, the turkey, guinea pig, and Muscovy duck were New World animals that were transferred to Europe.

Medicines

European exploration of tropical areas was aided by the New World discovery of quinine, the first effective treatment for malaria. Europeans suffered from this disease, but some indigenous populations had developed at least partial resistance to it. In Africa, resistance to malaria has been associated with other genetic changes among sub-Saharan Africans and their descendants, which can cause sickle-cell disease. The resistance of sub-Saharan Africans to malaria in the southern United States and the Caribbean contributed greatly to the specific character of the Africa-sourced slavery in those regions.

Similarly, yellow fever is thought to have been brought to the Americas from Africa via the Atlantic slave trade. Because it was endemic in Africa, many people there had acquired immunity. Europeans suffered higher rates of death than did African-descended persons when exposed to yellow fever in Africa and the Americas, where numerous epidemics swept the colonies beginning in the 17th century and continuing into the late 19th century. The disease caused widespread fatalities in the Caribbean during the heyday of slave-based sugar plantation. The replacement of native forests by sugar plantations and factories facilitated its spread in the tropical area by reducing the number of potential natural mosquito predators. The means of yellow fever transmission was unknown until 1881, when Carlos Finlay suggested that the disease was transmitted through mosquitoes, now known to be female mosquitoes of the species Aedes aegypti.

Cultural exchanges
One of the results of the movement of people between New and Old Worlds were cultural exchanges. For example, in the article "The Myth of Early Globalization: The Atlantic Economy, 1500–1800", Pieter Emmer makes the point that "from 1500 onward, a 'clash of cultures' had begun in the Atlantic". This clash of culture involved the transfer of European values to indigenous cultures. As an example, the emergence of the concept of private property in regions where property was often viewed as communal, concepts of monogamy (although many indigenous peoples were already monogamous), the role of women and children in the social system, and different concepts of labor, including slavery, although slavery was already a practice among many indigenous peoples and was widely practiced or introduced by Europeans into the Americas. Another example included the European abhorrence of human sacrifice, a religious practice among some indigenous populations.

During the initial stages of European colonization of the Americas, Europeans encountered fence-less lands. They believed that the land was unimproved and available for their taking, as they sought economic opportunity and homesteads. However, when European settlers arrived in Virginia, they encountered a fully established indigenous people, the Powhatan. The Powhatan farmers in Virginia scattered their farm plots within larger cleared areas. These larger cleared areas were a communal place for growing useful plants. As the Europeans viewed fences as hallmarks of civilization, they set about transforming "the land into something more suitable for themselves".

Tobacco was a New World agricultural product, originally a luxury good spread as part of the Columbian exchange. As is discussed in regard to the trans-Atlantic slave trade, the tobacco trade increased demand for free labor and spread tobacco worldwide. In discussing the widespread uses of tobacco, the Spanish physician Nicolas Monardes (1493–1588) noted that "The black people that have gone from these parts to the Indies, have taken up the same manner and use of tobacco that the Indians have". As Europeans traveled to other parts of the world, they took with them the practices related to tobacco. Demand for tobacco grew in the course of these cultural exchanges among peoples.

One of the most clearly notable areas of cultural clash and exchange was that of religion, often the lead point of cultural conversion. In the Spanish and Portuguese dominions, the spread of Catholicism, steeped in a European values system, was a major objective of colonization. Europeans often pursued it via explicit policies of suppression of indigenous languages, cultures and religions. In British America, Protestant missionaries converted many members of indigenous tribes to Protestantism. The French colonies had a more outright religious mandate, as some of the early explorers, such as Jacques Marquette, were also Catholic priests. In time, and given the European technological and immunological superiority which aided and secured their dominance, indigenous religions declined in the centuries following the European settlement of the Americas.

While Mapuche people did adopt the horse, sheep, and wheat, the over-all scant adoption of Spanish technology by Mapuche has been characterized as a means of cultural resistance.

According to Caroline Dodds Pennock, in Atlantic history indigenous people are often seen as static recipients of transatlantic encounters.  But thousands of Native Americans crossed the ocean during the sixteenth century, some by choice.

Organism examples

Later history 

Plants that arrived by land, sea, or air in the times before 1492 are called archaeophytes, and plants introduced to Europe after those times are called neophytes. Invasive species of plants and pathogens also were introduced by chance, including such weeds as tumbleweeds (Salsola spp.) and wild oats (Avena fatua). Some plants introduced intentionally, such as the kudzu vine introduced in 1894 from Japan to the United States to help control soil erosion, have since been found to be invasive pests in the new environment.

Fungi have also been transported, such as the one responsible for Dutch elm disease, killing American elms in North American forests and cities, where many had been planted as street trees. Some of the invasive species have become serious ecosystem and economic problems after establishing in the New World environments. A beneficial, although probably unintentional, introduction is Saccharomyces eubayanus, the yeast responsible for lager beer now thought to have originated in Patagonia. Others have crossed the Atlantic to Europe and have changed the course of history. In the 1840s, Phytophthora infestans crossed the oceans, damaging the potato crop in several European nations. In Ireland, the potato crop was totally destroyed; the Great Famine of Ireland caused millions to starve to death or emigrate.

In addition to these, many animals were introduced to new habitats on the other side of the world either accidentally or incidentally. These include such animals as brown rats, earthworms (apparently absent from parts of the pre-Columbian New World), and zebra mussels, which arrived on ships. Escaped and feral populations of non-indigenous animals have thrived in both the Old and New Worlds, often negatively impacting or displacing native species. In the New World, populations of feral European cats, pigs, horses, and cattle are common, and the Burmese python and green iguana are considered problematic in Florida. In the Old World, the Eastern gray squirrel has been particularly successful in colonising Great Britain, and populations of raccoons can now be found in some regions of Germany, the Caucasus, and Japan. Fur farm escapees such as coypu and American mink have extensive populations.

See also 

 Arab Agricultural Revolution
 Early impact of Mesoamerican goods in Iberian society
 First contact (anthropology)
 Great American Interchange
 List of food plants native to the Americas
 Pre-Columbian trans-oceanic contact theories
 Global silver trade from the 16th to 19th centuries
 Transformation of culture

References

Further reading
 The Columbian Exchange: Plants, Animals, and Disease between the Old and New Worlds by Alfred W. Crosby (2009)
 1491: New Revelations of the Americas Before Columbus by Charles C. Mann (2006)
 Indian Givers: How the Indians of the Americas Transformed the World by Jack Weatherford (2010)

External links 
 Worlds Together, Worlds Apart by Jeremy Adelman, Stephen Aron, Stephen Kotkin, et al.
 Foods that Changed the World by Steven R. King from the Wayback Machine
 The Columbian Exchange video, study guide, analysis, and teaching guide

Agricultural revolutions
History of agriculture
History of Europe
History of globalization
History of indigenous peoples of the Americas
History of the Americas
Horticulture
Introduced species
Invasive species
Spanish colonization of the Americas
Spanish exploration in the Age of Discovery
History of the Atlantic Ocean
Transatlantic cultural exchange
Age of Discovery
Western culture